The Callahan House, also known as the Jacob Helm House, is a historic home located in the Delaware Water Gap National Recreation Area south of Milford, in Dingman Township, Pike County, Pennsylvania. It was built in two sections, with the older dated to about 1800 and the later to about 1820. It is a long, -story, clapboard-clad frame dwelling with a steep gable roof. It features exposed chimney backs at the first floor exterior in the Dutch style, and a porch along the newer wing.

It served as an inn, and is believed to have been a station on the Underground Railroad.

It was listed on the National Register of Historic Places in 1979.

References

External links
 Jacob Helm House, U.S. Route 209 (Dingman Township), Milford, Pike County, PA: 9 photos, 9 data pages, and 1 photo caption page, at Historic American Buildings Survey

Houses on the Underground Railroad
Houses on the National Register of Historic Places in Pennsylvania
Houses completed in 1820
Houses in Pike County, Pennsylvania
National Register of Historic Places in Pike County, Pennsylvania
Underground Railroad in Pennsylvania